Jacob Rees (15 October 1844 – 16 October 1933) was a British architect. His work was part of the architecture event in the art competition at the 1912 Summer Olympics.

References

1844 births
1933 deaths
19th-century British architects
20th-century British architects
Olympic competitors in art competitions
People from Merthyr Tydfil